HMS Cowdray was a Type II  destroyer of the Royal Navy which served in World War II. She has been the only Royal Navy ship to bear the name. She was scrapped in 1959.

Service history
Cowdray was ordered on 4 September 1939 under the 1939 War Emergency Build Programme as job number J1116. She was completed on 29 July 1942 and adopted by the town of Chichester, West Sussex, as part of Warship Week in 1942.

On 8 November 1942 she sustained extensive damage during service in the Mediterranean. Repairs took most of 1943 and 1944. As a result, she only saw a total of three months active service during the Second World War. She earned battle honours during the Second World War for service on the Arctic Convoys, Atlantic, North Sea, North Africa and the English Channel. In mid-1945 she was prepared for service in the Far East, but only completed a few weeks in the East Indies before return to the UK in November 1945.

On 5 December 1945 she arrived at Chatham for service with the Nore Local Flotilla. She then transferred to the Reserve Fleet at Chatham in January 1950. She was then moved to Portsmouth in 1953 and laid up. She was then sold to BISCO for scrap. She arrived at the breakers yard of JJ King at Sunderland on 3 September 1959.

References

Publications
 
 

 

1941 ships
Hunt-class destroyers of the Royal Navy